Oregon Route 222 (OR 222) is an Oregon state highway, consisting of two disconnected sections in Lane County.

The north section runs from OR 126 Business in Springfield to OR 58 near Pleasant Hill.

The south section runs from a point on Cloverdale Road north of Rodgers Road near Cloverdale, along Cloverdale Road, to OR 99 in Creswell.

OR 222 is known as the Springfield-Creswell Highway No. 222 (see Oregon highways and routes). OR 222 was established in 2002 as part of Oregon's project to assign route numbers to highways that previously were not assigned.

Route description 

The north section of OR 222 begins at an intersection with OR 126 Business at Springfield and heads south via S 42nd st, then east, then south Via Jasper Rd., through Jasper, Over the Middle Fork of the Willamette via Parkway Rd. then south Ending in Pleasant Hill, OR 222 intersects with OR 58, where the north section ends.

The Bypass of the S 49th approach to Jasper Rd. is the Bob Straub Pkwy beginning at the intersection of OR 126 and Business 126 (Main st.) South to Jasper Rd. Phase I of the Bob Straub Pkwy was a  segment from Main St. to S 57th st. Phase II of the Pkwy was a  segment from S 57th st. to Jasper Rd.

The south section of OR 222 begins on Cloverdale Road approximately 1/10 mile north of Rodgers Road.  It heads south and then west to Creswell, where it ends at an intersection with OR 99.

History 

OR 222 was assigned to the Springfield-Creswell Highway in 2002.

Major intersections

References 

 Oregon Department of Transportation, Descriptions of US and Oregon Routes, https://web.archive.org/web/20051102084300/http://www.oregon.gov/ODOT/HWY/TRAFFIC/TEOS_Publications/PDF/Descriptions_of_US_and_Oregon_Routes.pdf, page 28.
 Oregon Department of Transportation, Springfield-Creswell Highway No. 222, ftp://ftp.odot.state.or.us/tdb/trandata/maps/slchart_pdfs_1980_to_2002/Hwy222_1999.pdf

222
Transportation in Lane County, Oregon